Stephen Harper (born 1959) is a former Canadian prime minister.

Stephen Harper may also refer to:

Stephen Harper (designer), British car designer
Steve Harper (born 1975), English footballer
Steve Harper (footballer, born 1969), English footballer
Steven C. Harper (born 1970), American professor at Brigham Young University
Steven Piziks (pseudonym Steven Harper), American author of science fiction and horror fiction
Steven Harper (Boston Public), high school principal on the American TV series Boston Public
Steven Harper, a character in The Alphabet Killer